Bisha K. Ali (born March 17, 1989) is a British-Pakistani stand-up comedian and screenwriter. She is the head writer for the streaming television series Ms. Marvel for Disney+.

Career
Bisha Ali was born to Pakistani parents. She worked as a data scientist and then a domestic violence support worker, before moving to a career in stand-up comedy. In 2012, she participated in the Royal Court Theatre's Young Writers programme. Her script Book Club, for a Sky diversity initiative, was optioned by Tiger Aspect Productions. She later wrote additional material for the series Sex Education.

Her first major scriptwriting role was for the 2019 miniseries Four Weddings and a Funeral, working with Mindy Kaling. In 2019, she was announced as head writer for the upcoming streaming television series Ms. Marvel for Disney+. She also was a writer on the fellow Marvel Studios series Loki.

Ali has written for The Huffington Post, and co-presented The Guilty Feminist podcast with Deborah Frances-White and GrownUpLand for BBC Radio 4.

Filmography

References

External links
 BAFTA Elevate profile
 

Living people
Showrunners
British comedians of Pakistani descent
British writers of Pakistani descent
British screenwriters
British stand-up comedians
21st-century British comedians
21st-century British screenwriters
British women television writers
Writers from London
Year of birth missing (living people)